Meiacanthus naevius, the birthmark fangblenny, is a species of combtooth blenny found in the eastern Indian ocean, around western Australia.  This species grows to a length of  SL.

References

Further reading

External links
Fishes of Australia

naevius
Fish described in 1987